The 1985 Houston Oilers season was the 26th season overall and 16th with the National Football League. The team improved upon their previous season's output of 3–13, winning five games, but failed to qualify for the playoffs for the fifth consecutive season.

Offseason

NFL draft

Personnel

Staff

Roster

Schedule

Note: Intra-division opponents are in bold text.

Standings

References

Houston Oilers seasons
Houston Oilers
Houston